SFV could refer to:

Simple file verification, computer file checksum format
Simian foamy virus
San Fernando Valley
Suitable For Vegans
Screaming for Vengeance, the eighth studio album released by heavy metal band Judas Priest in 1982
Street Fighter V, the fifth installment in the Street Fighter video game series
Swiss Football Association, governing body of football in Switzerland
National Property Board of Sweden, or Statens fastighetsverk, abbreviated SFV
Saybolt FUROL viscosity